Buzandaran Patmutiwnk ("Epic Histories") was a history of 4th-century Armenia, presumably composed in the 470s. The author of the work is uncertain. Until recently it had been assumed that it was written by a certain Faustus, however his existence is now disputed. The Byzantinist and Armenologist Nina Garsoïan argues that the author was an anonymous cleric who was sympathetic to the nobility and had some competence in preaching. The book starts with the death of St. Gregory the Illuminator in 331 and concludes with the partition of Armenia between Iran and Rome in 387.

Along with the Patmutyun Hayots ("History of Armenia") of Movses Khorenatsi (died 490s), the Buzandaran Patmutiwnk‘ has been referred to as two of the best Armenian sources in Parthian and Sasanian-related studies. It has been noted by both Garsoïan and James R. Russell for its numerous reflections of Iranian, particularly Parthian, traditions.

References

Sources

Further reading
 

History books about Armenia
5th-century history books